Helicopelta is a genus of sea snails, marine gastropod mollusks in the family Addisoniidae.

Species
Species within the genus Helicopelta include:
 Helicopelta marshalli Rubio & Rolán, 2020
 Helicopelta rostricola Marshall, 1996

References

Addisoniidae